A leprechaun is a diminutive supernatural being in Irish folklore, classed by some as a type of solitary fairy. They are usually depicted as little bearded men, wearing a coat and hat, who partake in mischief. In later times, they have been depicted as shoe-makers who have a hidden pot of gold at the end of the rainbow.

Leprechaun-like creatures rarely appear in Irish mythology and only became prominent in later folklore.

Etymology
The Anglo-Irish (Hiberno-English) word leprechaun is descended from Old Irish luchorpán or lupracán, via various (Middle Irish) forms such as luchrapán, lupraccán, (or var. luchrupán).

Modern forms

The current spelling  is used throughout Ireland, but there are numerous regional variants.

John O'Donovan's supplement to O'Reilly's Irish-English Dictionary defines  as "a sprite, a pigmy; a fairy of a diminutive size, who always carries a purse containing a shilling".

The Irish term leithbrágan in O'Reilly's Dictionary has also been recognized as an alternative spelling.

Other variant spellings in English have included lubrican, leprehaun, and lepreehawn. Some modern Irish books use the spelling lioprachán. The first recorded instance of the word in the English language was in Dekker's comedy The Honest Whore, Part 2 (1604): "As for your Irish lubrican, that spirit / Whom by preposterous charms thy lust hath rais'd / In a wrong circle."

Meanings
The word may have been coined as a compound of the roots lú or laghu (from  "small") and corp (from  "body"), or so it had been suggested by Whitley Stokes.  However, research published in 2019 suggests that the word derives from the Luperci and the associated Roman festival of Lupercalia.

Folk etymology derives the word from leith (half) and bróg (brogue), because of the frequent portrayal of the leprechaun as working on a single shoe, as evident in the alternative spelling leithbrágan.

Early attestations 

The text contains an episode in which Fergus mac Léti, King of Ulster, falls asleep on the beach and wakes to find himself being dragged into the sea by three lúchorpáin. He captures his abductors, who grant him three wishes in exchange for release.

Folklore 

The leprechaun is said to be a solitary creature, whose principal occupation is making and cobbling shoes, and who enjoys practical jokes. In McAnally's 1888 account, the Leprechaun was not a professional cobbler, but was frequently seen mending his own shoes, as "he runs about so much he wears them out" with great frequency. This is, he claims, the perfect opportunity for a human being to capture the Leprechaun, refusing to release him until the Leprechaun gives his captor supernatural wealth.

Classification

The leprechaun has been classed as a "solitary fairy" by the writer and amateur folklorist William Butler Yeats. Yeats was part of the revivalist literary movement greatly influential in "calling attention to the leprechaun" in the late 19th century. This classification by Yeats is derived from D. R. McAnally (Irish Wonders, 1888) derived in turn from John O'Hanlon (1870).

It is stressed that the leprechaun, though some may call it fairy, is clearly to be distinguished from the Aos Sí (or the 'good people') of the fairy mounds (sidhe) and raths. Leprachaun being solitary is one distinguishing characteristic, but additionally, the leprachaun is thought to only engage in pranks on the level of mischief, and requiring special caution, but in contrast, the Aos Sí may carry out deeds more menacing to humans, e.g., the spiriting away of children.

This identification of leprechaun as a fairy has been consigned to popular notion by modern folklorist Diarmuid Ó Giolláin. Ó Giolláin observes that the dwarf of Teutonic and other traditions as well as the household familiar are more amenable to comparison.

According to William Butler Yeats, the great wealth of these fairies comes from the "treasure-crocks, buried of old in war-time", which they have uncovered and appropriated. According to David Russell McAnally the leprechaun is the son of an "evil spirit" and a "degenerate fairy" and is "not wholly good nor wholly evil".

Appearance

The leprechaun originally had a different appearance depending on where in Ireland he was found. Prior to the 20th century, it was generally held that the leprechaun wore red, not green. Samuel Lover, writing in 1831, describes the leprechaun as,... quite a beau in his dress, notwithstanding, for he wears a red square-cut coat, richly laced with gold, and inexpressible of the same, cocked hat, shoes and buckles.

According to Yeats, the solitary fairies, like the leprechaun, wear red jackets, whereas the "trooping fairies" wear green. The leprechaun's jacket has seven rows of buttons with seven buttons to each row. On the western coast, he writes, the red jacket is covered by a frieze one, and in Ulster the creature wears a cocked hat, and when he is up to anything unusually mischievous, he leaps onto a wall and spins, balancing himself on the point of the hat with his heels in the air.

According to McAnally the universal leprechaun is  described as

This dress could vary by region, however. In McAnally's account there were differences between leprechauns or Logherymans from different regions:
The Northern Leprechaun or Logheryman wore a "military red coat and white breeches, with a broad-brimmed, high, pointed hat, on which he would sometimes stand upside down".
The Lurigadawne of Tipperary wore an "antique slashed jacket of red, with peaks all round and a jockey cap, also sporting a sword, which he uses as a magic wand".
The Luricawne of Kerry was a "fat, pursy little fellow whose jolly round face rivals in redness the cut-a-way jacket he wears, that always has seven rows of seven buttons in each row".
The Cluricawne of Monaghan wore "a swallow-tailed evening coat of red with green vest, white breeches, black stockings," shiny shoes, and a "long cone hat without a brim," sometimes used as a weapon.

In a poem entitled The Lepracaun; or, Fairy Shoemaker, 18th century Irish poet William Allingham describes the appearance of the leprechaun as:
...A wrinkled, wizen'd, and bearded Elf,
Spectacles stuck on his pointed nose,
Silver buckles to his hose,
Leather apron — shoe in his lap...

The modern image of the leprechaun sitting on a toadstool, having a red beard and green hat, etc. is clearly a more modern invention, or borrowed from other strands of European folklore. The most likely explanation for the modern day Leprechaun appearance is that green is a traditional national Irish color dating back as far as 1642. The hat might be derived from the style of outdated fashion still common in Ireland in the 19th century. This style of fashion was commonly worn by Irish immigrants to the United States, since some Elizabethan era clothes were still common in Ireland in the 19th century long after they were out of fashion, as depicted by the Stage Irish. The buckle shoes and other garments also have their origin in the Elizabethan period in Ireland.

Related creatures
The leprechaun is related to the clurichaun and the far darrig in that he is a solitary creature. Some writers even go as far as to substitute these second two less well-known spirits for the leprechaun in stories or tales to reach a wider audience. The clurichaun is considered by some to be merely a leprechaun on a drinking spree.

In politics

In the politics of the Republic of Ireland, leprechauns have been used to refer to the twee aspects of the tourism field in Ireland. This can be seen from this example of John A. Costello addressing the Oireachtas in 1963—
For many years, we were afflicted with the miserable trivialities of our tourist advertising. Sometimes it descended to the lowest depths, to the caubeen and the shillelagh, not to speak of the leprechaun.

Popular culture

Films, television cartoons and advertising have popularised a specific image of leprechauns which bears little resemblance to anything found in the cycles of Irish folklore. It has been argued that the popularised image of a leprechaun is little more than a series of stereotypes based on derogatory 19th-century caricatures.

Many Celtic Music groups have used the term Leprechaun LeperKhanz as part of their naming convention or as an album title.  Even popular forms of American music have used the mythological character, including heavy metal, celtic metal, punk rock and jazz.

 Possibly the most notable of all is Lucky the mascot of Lucky Charms cereal, made by General Mills.
 The Notre Dame Leprechaun is the official mascot of the Fighting Irish sports teams at the University of Notre Dame
 Boston Celtics logo features the mascot of the team, Lucky the Leprechaun
 Professional wrestler Dylan Mark Postl competed and appeared as Hornswoggle, a leprechaun who lived under the ring, for the majority of his WWE tenure.
 The 1993 American horror slasher-film Leprechaun and its sequels feature a killer leprechaun portrayed by Warwick Davis.

Nobel Prize-winning economist Paul Krugman coined the term "leprechaun economics" to describe distorted or unsound economic data, which he first used in a tweet on 12 July 2016 in response to the publication by the Irish Central Statistics Office (CSO) that Irish GDP had grown by 26.3%, and Irish GNP had grown by 18.7%, in the 2015 Irish national accounts. The growth was subsequently shown to be due to Apple restructuring its double Irish tax scheme which the EU Commission had fined €13bn in 2004–2014 Irish unpaid taxes, the largest corporate tax fine in history. The term has been used many times since.

In America, Leprechauns are often associated with St. Patrick's Day along with the color green and shamrocks.

Darby O'Gill 

The Disney film Darby O'Gill and the Little People (1959)—based on Herminie Templeton Kavanagh's Darby O'Gill books—which features a leprechaun king, is a work in which Fergus mac Léti was "featured parenthetically". In the film, the captured leprechaun king grants three wishes, like Fergus in the saga.

While the film project was in development, Walt Disney was in contact with, and consulting Séamus Delargy and the Irish Folklore Commission, but never asked for leprechaun material, even though a large folkloric repository on such subject was housed by the commission.

See also

 Crichton Leprechaun
 Irish mythology in popular culture
 Leprechaun traps
 Mooinjer veggey
 Sleih beggey

Explanatory notes

References

Citations

Bibliography

 ; online text via UCD.
 Briggs, Katharine. An Encyclopedia of Fairies: Hobgoblins, Brownies, Bogies, and Other Supernatural Creatures. New York: Pantheon, 1978.
 Croker, T. C. Fairy Legends and Traditions of the South of Ireland. London: William Tegg, 1862.
 Hyde, Douglas. Beside The Fire. London: David Nutt, 1910.
 
 Keightley, T. The Fairy Mythology: Illustrative of the Romance and Superstition of Various Countries. London: H. G. Bohn, 1870.
 
 
 Lover, S. Legends and Stories of Ireland. London: Baldwin and Cradock, 1831.

 
 
 Negra, D. [ed.]. The Irish in Us: Irishness, Performativity and Popular Culture. Durham, NC: Duke University Press. 2006. .
 
 
 Wilde, Jane. [Speranza, pseud.]. Ancient Legends, Mystic Charms, and Superstitions of Ireland. London : Ward and Downey, 1887.

External links 
 

 
Mythological tricksters
Lupercalia